The Save Mart Companies is an American grocery store operator founded and headquartered in Modesto, California. It owns and operates stores under the names of Save Mart, Lucky, Lucky California, FoodMaxx, and Maxx Value Foods. The stores are located in northern and central California and northern Nevada.

Overview
Save Mart stores are full-service grocery stores with a broad product offering, including fresh produce, bakery goods, deli foods and ethnic foods. In Lodi and Stockton, an unrelated Save Mart chain operated and so stores were branded under the S-Mart Foods name. The unrelated chain has since folded and the stores in Lodi and Stockton are now under the Save Mart banner.

Company history
	
 1952 – First Save Mart store opens in Modesto, California.
 1973 – Yosemite Wholesale opens in Merced, California.
 1981 – Bob Piccinini is named president.
 1984 – Save Mart partners with two other retailers to launch Mid-Valley Dairy, producer of Sunnyside Farms products. SMART Refrigerated Transport opens in Turlock, California.
 1985 – Bob Piccinini purchases Save Mart Supermarkets and becomes CEO.
 1986 – Opens its first two FoodMaxx stores in Bakersfield, California in partnership with the Fleming Company.
 1988 – Partners with two other retailers to open Sunnyside Farms Dairy product plant in Turlock.
 1989 – Acquires 27 Fry's supermarkets in the San Francisco Bay Area.
 1991 – Helps found and becomes a voting partner in Super Store Industries (SSI).
 1997 – Acquires 10 Lucky stores in California.
 2006 – Acquires Albertsons stores in the Sacramento, California area, San Francisco Bay Area, Central Valley and northern Nevada and converts them to Lucky and Save Mart stores in 2007.
 2022 – The company is acquired by private equity firm Kingswood Capital Management.

Banners and brands

Save Mart Supermarkets includes a number of store banners and private label product brands.

Lucky

Lucky is a chain of full-service grocery stores with a broad product offering, including fresh produce, bakery goods, deli foods, and ethnic foods. The chain operates in and around the San Francisco Bay Area under its own banner and its newer banner concept, Lucky California. Lucky is a revival of the original chain after Save Mart acquired the northern California Albertsons stores from Cerberus Capital Management in 2006, which included the rights to use the Lucky name.

FoodMaxx

FoodMaxx is Save Mart's warehouse-style grocery chain. It began in 1986, when Save Mart's then-CEO Bob Piccinini  saw the potential of the no-frills grocery store concept which offered the same products at a fraction of the price. Piccinini opened two new Food 4 Less stores in the Fresno area.

After the success of the two new Food 4 Less stores, the first FoodMaxx in Fresno opened in 1989. By 2000, 15 stores had opened. As of 2021, There are currently 51 store locations in California and 2 in Nevada.

Maxx Value Foods
A grocery store in Modesto that offers products at warehouse-store prices without a store club membership fee. It is part of the FoodMaxx banner.

Store brands
 Sunny Select – grocery products
 Market Essentials - grocery products
 Simply Done - paper products (toilet paper, napkins, foil, plates, etc.)
 Valu Time – packaged foods and general merchandise
 Sunnyside Farms – dairy and frozen foods
 Bayview Farms – dairy and frozen foods
 Pacific Coast Selections – fresh and packaged foods
 Pacific Coast Café – coffee
 Full Circle – organic packaged foods
 Master Cut – meats
 Maxx Value – meats
 Master Catch – fish and seafood
 Top Care – over-the-counter medications
 Paws Premium – pet food
 Bohemian Hearth - bread
 Lucky California - specialty deli

Distribution infrastructure
Super Store Industries (Lathrop) also produces and packages bottled beverages, cultured dairy products, and frozen dairy products for several brands, including Sunnyside Farms yogurt, Stater Brothers ice cream, and Minute Maid orange juice. SSI owns and operates Sunnyside Farms (Fairfield) and Sunnyside Farms Dairy (Turlock).

 Yosemite Wholesale (Merced) is a dry and packaged good warehouse servicing all of the company's stores.
 Save Mart Supermarkets Distribution Center (Roseville) services all of the company's stores.
 SMART Refrigerated Transport (Lathrop) is a trucking firm that transports dry groceries, frozen foods, ice, and novelties to all of Save Mart Supermarkets’ stores. The company also works as an outside contractor hauling products for other retailers.

Store closures
Since 2010 the company has closed stores in Bakersfield, Clovis, Delano, Elk Grove, Folsom, Fresno, Kerman, Madera, Merced, Milpitas, Modesto, Sparks, Sanger, San Pablo, California, Tracy and Yuba City, due to competition, higher prices and other reasons.

Lawsuits
In a 2013 settlement with 35 California district attorneys, the company agreed to pay $2.55 million in civil penalties, costs and expenses for violating state law on storage, handling and disposal of hazardous materials, including bleaches, batteries, electronic devices, ignitible liquids, aerosol products and cleaning products.

In 2015 the company agreed to pay $277,319 in back pay and damages to distribution center workers in Vacaville (now closed) and Roseville. A U.S. Department of Labor investigation found the company failed to include bonuses in the employee rate of pay when computing overtime.

Unions
Employees at the company's stores are represented by labor unions. These include:
United Food and Commercial Workers, Teamsters, Service Employees International Union and Machinist Automotive Trades District.

References

External links

 Save Mart website

Retail companies established in 1952
Companies based in Stanislaus County, California
Supermarkets of the United States
1952 establishments in California